Nord-Pas-de-Calais); is a former administrative region of France. Since 1 January 2016, it has been part of the new region Hauts-de-France. It consisted of the departments of Nord and Pas-de-Calais. Nord-Pas-de-Calais borders the English Channel (west), the North Sea (northwest), Belgium (north and east) and Picardy (south). The majority of the region was once part of the historical (Southern) Netherlands, but gradually became part of France between 1477 and 1678, particularly during the reign of king Louis XIV. The historical French provinces that preceded Nord-Pas-de-Calais are Artois, French Flanders, French Hainaut and (partially) Picardy. These provincial designations are still frequently used by the inhabitants.

With its 330.8 people per km2 on just over 12,414 km2, it is a densely populated region, having some 4.1 million inhabitants, 7% of France's total population, making it the fourth most populous region in the country, 83% of whom live in urban communities. Its administrative centre and largest city is Lille. Other major towns include Valenciennes, Lens, Douai, Béthune, Dunkirk, Maubeuge, Boulogne, Arras, Cambrai and Saint-Omer. The region is featured in numerous films, including Bienvenue chez les Ch'tis.

Name

Nord-Pas-de-Calais combines the names of the constituent departments of Nord (literally 'North', the northernmost department of France) and Pas-de-Calais ('Strait of Calais', the French name of the Strait of Dover). The regional council, however, spells the name Nord-Pas de Calais.

The northern part of the region was historically a part of the County of Flanders, with Douai as its capital. Those who wish to evidence the historical links the region has with Belgium and the Netherlands prefer to call this region the French Low Countries, which also means French Netherlands in French (French: Pays-Bas français; Dutch: Franse Nederlanden or Franse Lage Landen). Other alternative names are Région Flandre(s)-Artois, Hauts-de-France, ('Upper France') and Picardie-du-Nord ('Northern Picardy').

History

Inhabited since prehistoric times, the Nord-Pas-de-Calais region has always been a strategic (and hence one of the most fought-over) region in Europe. French President Charles de Gaulle, who was born in Lille, called the region a "fatal avenue" through which invading armies repeatedly passed. Over the centuries, it was conquered in turn by the Celtic Belgae, the Romans, the Germanic Franks, England, the Spanish and Austrian Netherlands, and the Dutch Republic. After the final French annexation in the early 18th century, much of the region was again occupied by Germany during the First and Second World Wars.

During the 4th and 5th centuries, the Roman practice of co-opting Germanic tribes to provide military and defense services along the route from Boulogne to Cologne created a Germanic–Romance linguistic border in the region that persisted until the 8th century. By the 9th century, most inhabitants north of Lille spoke a dialect of Middle Dutch, while the inhabitants to the south spoke a variety of Romance dialects. This linguistic border is still evident today in the place names of the region. Beginning in the 9th century, the linguistic border began a steady move to north and the east. By the end of the 13th century, the linguistic border had shifted to the river Lys in the south and Cap-Griz-Nez in the west.

During the Middle Ages, the Pas-de-Calais department comprised County of Boulogne and the County of Artois, while the Nord department was mostly made up of the southern portions of the County of Flanders and the County of Hainaut.  Boulogne, Artois, and Flanders were fiefs of the French crown, while Hainaut and after 1493 Flanders were within the Holy Roman Empire. Calais was an English possession from 1347 to 1558, when it was recovered by the French throne.  In the 15th century, all of the territories, except Calais, were united under the rule of the Dukes of Burgundy, along with other territories in northern France and areas in what is now Belgium, Luxembourg, and the Netherlands.  With the death of the Burgundian duke Charles the Bold in 1477, the Boulonnais and Artois were seized by the French crown, while Flanders and Hainaut were inherited by Charles's daughter Marie.  Shortly thereafter, in 1492, Artois was ceded back to Marie's son Philip the Handsome, as part of an attempt to keep Philip's father, Emperor Maximilian I, neutral in French King Charles VIII's prospective invasion of Italy.

Thus, most of the territories of what is now Nord-Pas-de-Calais were reunited to the Burgundian inheritance, which had passed through Marie's marriage to the House of Habsburg.  These territories formed an integral part of the Seventeen Provinces of the Netherlands as they were defined during the reign of Philip's son, Emperor Charles V, and passed to Charles's son, Philip II of Spain. During the Italian Wars much of the conflict between France and Spain occurred in the region. When the Netherlands revolted against Spanish rule, beginning in 1566, the territories in what is now Nord-Pas-de-Calais were those most loyal to the throne, and proved the base from which the Duke of Parma was able to bring the whole southern part of the Netherlands back under Spanish control. It was also a base for Spanish support of French Catholics in the French Wars of Religion.

During the wars between France and Spain in the 17th century (1635 –1659, 1667–68, 1672–78, 1688–97), these territories became the principal seat of conflict between the two states and French control over the area was gradually established. Beginning with the annexation of Artois in 1659, most of the current Nord department territory had been acquired by the time of the Treaty of Nijmegen in 1678.  The current borders were mostly established by the time of the Treaty of Ryswick in 1697.

The area, previously divided among the French provinces of Flanders, Artois, and Picardy, was divided into its two present departments following the French Revolution of 1789. Under Napoleon, the French boundary was extended to include all of Flanders and present-day Belgium until the Congress of Vienna in 1815 restored the original French boundary.

During the 19th century, the region underwent major industrialisation and became one of the leading industrial regions of France, second only to Alsace-Lorraine. Nord-Pas-de-Calais was barely touched by the Franco-Prussian War of 1870; the war actually helped it to cement its leading role in French industry due to the loss of Alsace-Lorraine to Germany. However, it suffered catastrophic damage in the two World Wars of the 20th century.

World War I
When the First World War started, the region became a strategic target for the Allies and the Central Powers, mostly because of the coal and mining resources. When the German troops launched their attack from Belgium, the region was one of the first to fall under German occupation. Nevertheless, when the Allies stopped Germany at the Battle of Marne, the front moved back to the area and stabilized near Arras.
During the next four years, the region was split in two: the German holding the French Flanders and Cambrai area, the Allied controlling Arras and the Area of Lens. Nevertheless, the combat did not stop, each side wanting the total control of the area.

The Nord pas de Calais was one of the main theaters of the conflict, with many battles occurring between 1914 and 1918, including the Battle of Vimy Ridge assault during the Battle of Arras (1917), the Battle of Artois, Battle of Loos and the Battle of Cambrai. By the time the region was finally liberated by the Canadian Expeditionary Forces, the entire country was devastated and Arras had been 90% destroyed. Currently, there are 650 military cemeteries throughout the Nord-Pas-de Calais, mostly British and Canadian, as well as large memorials such as the Canadian National Vimy Memorial and Notre Dame de Lorette, the world's largest French military cemetery.

World War II

During the occupation of France, it was attached to the Military Administration in Belgium and Northern France, ruled from the Wehrmacht kommandantur in Brussels. The Nord-Pas-de-Calais region was used for vengeance weapon installations, including extensive V-1 "ski sites" that launched attacks on England and massive bunkers for the V-2 rocket and V-3 cannon. Operation Crossbow counteroffensive bombing by the Allies devastated many of the region's towns.  Although most of the region was liberated in September 1944, Dunkirk was the last French town to be freed from German occupation (on 9 May 1945).

Postwar period

Since the war, the region has suffered from severe economic difficulties (see Economy below) but has benefited from the opening of the Channel Tunnel and the growth in cross-Channel traffic in general.

Demographics

While the region is predominantly French-speaking, it also has two significant minority language communities: the western Flemings, whose presence is evident in the many Dutch place names in the area and who speak West Flemish, a dialect of Dutch (perhaps 20,000 inhabitants of Nord-Pas-de-Calais use Flemish daily and an estimated 40,000 use it occasionally, both primarily in and around the arrondissement of Dunkirk); and the Picards, who speak the Picard language, or Ch'ti (speakers, "chitimi", have been working to revive the nearly-extinct regional speech since the 1980s).  Although neighbouring Belgium currently recognizes and fosters both Picard and Dutch, and a few city-level governments within Nord-Pas-de-Calais have introduced initiatives to encourage both languages, the national French government maintains a policy of linguistic unity and generally ignores both languages, as it does with other regional languages in France.

The region's ethnic diversity has been affected by repeated waves of immigrant workers from abroad: Belgians and Welsh before 1910; Poles and Italians in the 1920s and 1930s; Eastern European groups and Germans since 1945; and North Africans and Portuguese since 1960; and large cities like Lille, Calais, and Boulogne-sur-Mer are home to sizable communities of British, Dutch, Scandinavian, Greek and Balkans, Sub-Saharan African, and Latin American immigrants and their descendants.

The French state has sought to boost the region's relatively neglected culture. In 2004, it was announced that a branch of the Louvre would be opened in the city of Lens. For decades, the Nord-Pas-de-Calais has been viewed as a conservative region when compared culturally to the rest of France, but recently the region has at times displayed left-wing tendencies. In the early 2000s, the leftist Green Party won the largest number of votes to nearly carry a majority in regional and local representation. The Greens managed to attract many conservative voters from small towns and farmers moved by the Greens' commitment to boosting agri-industry.

The region's religious profile is representative of France as a whole, with the majority being Roman Catholic.  Other Christian groups are found in the region: Protestants have a few churches. North Africans have introduced Islam to the region, and small but growing communities of Buddhists have been established in recent years. Prior to World War II, around 4,000 Jews lived in Nord-Pas-de-Calais. A small Jewish community remains active as it has been for hundreds of years.

Economy

General data
In 2014, the Nord-Pas de Calais GDP reached €140 billion making it the 4th biggest French economy, although this figure has to be put in the context of the large population of the region. The region was only in 16th place out of 24 for GDP per capita in 2014 with €34,422.

The unemployment rate is higher than the national average. About 11% of the population was unemployed in 2014, particularly people aged between 18 and 25.

The economy is essentially led by the service sector, which employs 75% of the working population, followed by manufacturing (23%) and agriculture (2%).

Agriculture and fishing 
Due to its location close to the North Sea, the Nord-Pas de Calais region has a strong fishing industry.

The Boulogne-sur-Mer harbor is the biggest French port in terms of capacity with more than 150 boats. 45,000 tons of fish were traded there in 2012. The harbor is also a leading European seafood processing center with 380,000 tons of shellfish, fish and seaweed traded every year. Some 140 companies are present in the port.

The agricultural sector comprises 13,800 farm businesses using  of farmland. The temperate climate as well as great fertility makes the region a leading production center. The Nord-Pas de Calais region supplied 26.1 million tons of wheat (approximately 7% of the national production) and a third of the French potato production.

Industry 
The region's industry was originally focused on coal and textile production, and was one of the cradles of the Industrial Revolution on the continent. After the end of the Second World War, migrant workers from all over Europe came to the region, making up for population losses due to the war. In the 1970s, the leading coal and textile industries began to fade away and unemployment rates increased rapidly. The region started a process of restructuring which still continues today. Nowadays, the manufacturing sector is led by the automobile industry.

The Nord-Pas de Calais Mining Basin was the leading region of coal production in France in the late 19th and early 20th centuries. For its three-hundred-year history of mining and its testimony to the advent of industrialization in France, the mining basin was listed on the UNESCO World Heritage List in 2012.

Automobile industry 
In the 1970s, the sector represented a small part of the working population. Some 40 years later, it is the main industry in the region, employing 55,000 people. In terms of productivity, the Nord-Pas de Calais region is ranked second nationwide and is one of the main export areas.

Three main worldwide car manufacturers operate plants in the region: Toyota produce the Yaris in Valenciennes, Renault build the Scénic in Douai, and PSA Peugeot Citroën operate a plant in Lieu-Saint-Amand where Peugeot 807, Citroën C8, Fiat Scudo, Peugeot Expert and Citroën Jumpy are fabricated. In addition, automotive equipment manufacturers such as Faurecia employ 6,200 workers in the region. Small-scale manufacturers have also been based in the region, such as microcar manufacturers ERAD, Savel, and Secma.

Nord-Pas de Calais is the second main region for the automotive industry in France after Île de France (Paris region). The sector trade fair, the Forum on European Automotive Industry in Lille Region (FEAL), takes place biennially to showcase the industry of the region and its importance for France and Europe.

Food industry 
The food industry in Nord-Pas de Calais draws on the agricultural sector of the region. By income, this is the most important industry of the region due to strong exports (€3.2bn in 2006). More than 27,000 employees were employed in the sector in 2007. Many global corporations such as McCain Foods, Roquette Freres, Bonduelle, Pasquier or Boulangeries Paul are present in the Nord-Pas de Calais region.

Services

Mulliez Family 
The services sector of the Nord-Pas de Calais region is dominated by the multi-billionaire Mulliez family, who own the main superstore chains of the region, some of which are known worldwide: Auchan, Decathlon or Leroy Merlin as well as the Flunch restaurant chain. The family also holds a stake in 3 Suisses, Norauto and many other companies.

Transport Infrastructures

As most of its population is urbanized, the region has a dense and complex transport system of highways, railways, airport and seaports.

Highways 
Nine highways are passing through the region; most of them are free:
 A1 between Lille and Paris
 A2 towards Brussels
 A16 Between Dunkirk and Paris
 A21 between Bouvignies and Pecquencourt
 A22 between Lille and Ghent
 A23 between Lesquin and Valenciennes
 A25 between Dunkirk and Lille
 A26 between Calais and Troyes
 A27 between Lille and Tournai

Railways

Eurotunnel 
Since 1994, the Nord-Pas de Calais region is linked to the United Kingdom by the Eurotunnel. The structure comprises three tunnels (one single-track railway tunnel each way and a service road tunnel for maintenance and emergency use) and has the longest undersea tunnel section of the world. Between its official opening and 2012, 300 million passengers have crossed the English Channel aboard Eurostar trains. In addition to Eurostar services, the tunnel is used by trains carrying road vehicles, branded as Le Shuttle, as well as freight trains.

TER-Nord 
The TER-Nord is the regional rail network operated by the SNCF. It links the major cities and villages throughout Nord-Pas de Calais. The network is controlled by the Conseil régional.

Air transportation 
The main airport of Nord-Pas de Calais is Lesquin Airport near Lille. Originally a regional hub, the airport now has several international routes to destinations in Europe and the Maghreb.

Inland and International freight transport

Dunkirk harbour 
Dunkirk Harbour is one of the biggest seaports of France. It is the third-largest port nationally in terms of total volume but first in fruit and copper imports. A terminal able to handle LNG carriers is built by TotalEnergies.

Canal Seine-Nord 
The Canal Seine-Nord is a future high-capacity canal between the Seine and Arleux in order to connect the former to the other northern canals in Belgium, the Netherlands and Germany. It is due to open in 2016. The project has attracted controversy mostly because of its huge cost (€4.6bn).

Sports and culture

Training base for the Olympics 
Before London 2012, the region had been chosen by the Organising Committee as a training base for the participating delegations. During the months ahead of the Olympics, several countries sent their athletes to the region in order to prepare for the competitions. Among the teams training in Nord-Pas de Calais were the UK Gymnastics team in Arques, the New Zealand Rowing team in Gravelines and France's national basketball and handball teams.

Sports in Nord-Pas de Calais 
Football is the most developed sport of the region. More than 145,000 players are members of a football club. Four clubs have professional status and play at the highest levels: Lille OSC and RC Lens in Ligue 1 and Valenciennes FC in Ligue 2 and USBCO in the Championnat National. Arras Football's ladies play in Division 1.

Major communities

 Lille and surrounding area is home to over 1.5 million inhabitants.
 Arras
 Boulogne
 Calais
 Cambrai
 Douai
 Dunkirk
 Lens
 Liévin
 Marcq-en-Barœul
 Maubeuge
 Roubaix
 Saint-Omer
 Tourcoing
 Valenciennes
 Villeneuve d'Ascq
 Wattrelos

Education 
The regional education system of the Académie de Lille includes one million pupils and students. Higher education and research are supported within the Community of Universities and Institutions (COMUE) Lille Nord de France - (University of Lille).

An invitation to tender for a school construction and maintenance contract let by the region and the Département du Nord in 1998 included provision for employment generation to be included as an evaluation criterion for the award of the contract. The European Court of Justice held that the award criterion was illegal, but also ruled that where a contracting authority had to assess two or more economically equivalent bids, they could adopt employment opportunities as an "accessory criterion" as long as the use of this criterion was not discriminatory.

See also

 List of châteaux in Nord-Pas-de-Calais

Notes and references

External links

 Nord-Pas-de-Calais : between yesterday's resistance and today's hospitality- Official French website (in English)
 Regional Council of Nord-Pas-de-Calais 
 Official website: Tourism in Nord-Pas-deCalais

 
Coal mining regions in France
NUTS 1 statistical regions of the European Union
NUTS 2 statistical regions of the European Union
Former regions of France
Hauts-de-France